Sulk was a thoroughbred racehorse.  She was born in 1999 and won two races in 2001, including France's prestigious Prix Marcel Boussac, and placed as a three-year-old in the Nassau Stakes, Yorkshire Oaks, and the Prix Royal-Oak.  She was trained by John Gosden, and after finishing her racing career was a broodmare until she died in 2009 of colic.

References

1999 racehorse births
Racehorses bred in Ireland
Racehorses trained in the United Kingdom
Thoroughbred family 14-c